The 2nd Division, was one of the three Estonian divisions created during the Estonian War of Independence, which was active until the Soviet occupation of Estonia. Since the restoration of independence in 1991 there are no divisions currently among the Estonian Defence Forces.

History
The 2nd Division staff was based in Tartu. Since February 1, 1940, the division was made up by the Tartu Military District and Võru-Petseri Military District.

Order of battle
The unit order of battle in 1939:
7th Infantry Regiment
2nd Single Infantry Battalion
3rd Single Infantry Battalion
8th Single Infantry Battalion
Kuperjanov Partisan Battalion
Cavalry Regiment
3rd Artillery Group
4th Artillery Group

See also
1st Division
3rd Division
4th Division
1st Infantry Brigade

References

Divisions of Estonia
Estonian War of Independence
History of Tartu
Military units and formations established in 1920
1920 establishments in Estonia